NGC 1156 is a dwarf irregular galaxy in the Aries constellation of the type . It is considered a Magellanic-type irregular. The galaxy has a larger than average core, and contains zones of contra-rotating gas. The counter-rotation is thought to be the result of tidal interactions with another gas rich galaxy some time in the past.

It has a H II nucleus.

The AGES survey has discovered a candidate dark galaxy close to NGC 1156, one of only a few so far found.

References

External links
 
 Arecibo Survey Produces Dark Galaxy Candidate (SpaceDaily)
 http://www.astrophotos.net/pages/GALAXIES/NGC%201156.htm
 http://www.jupiter-jp.net/~ike/English/description/N1156.htm
 http://www.ursa.fi/~sirius/cgi-bin/rade.cgi?NGC1156

Dwarf irregular galaxies
Aries (constellation)
1156
02455
11329